Wally Cook (12 December 1925 – 21 November 1999) was  a former Australian rules footballer who played with Richmond in the Victorian Football League (VFL).

Notes

External links 
		
		
		
		
		

1925 births
1999 deaths
Australian rules footballers from Victoria (Australia)
Richmond Football Club players